Lewis Cochran Cassidy (October 17, 1829November 18, 1889) was an American lawyer and politician from Pennsylvania who served as Attorney General of Pennsylvania from 1883 to 1887.

Life and career

Cassidy was born in New York City, the child of Irish immigrants. The family moved to Philadelphia shortly afterwards. His father died when he was ten.

Cassidy attended Central High. Upon graduating, he studied law in the offices of Benjamin H. Brewster, and was admitted to the bar in 1849. He was immediately successful, and proved popular with the Moyamensing Hose Company, and was elected to the state House for the 1851 term. In 1852, Cassidy was elected Solicitor for the District of Moyamensing. By 1856, Cassidy was already considered a local political boss, and his influence helped elect Richard Vaux city mayor. He himself ran for District Attorney against William B. Mann, originally winning and inducted into office, but later losing after a judge ruled for Mann.

During the Civil War and afterwards, he was a staunch supporter of Union and federal coercion. He became a local leader of Democratic party politics. His support helped Robert E. Pattison become Governor—the state's only Democratic governor between the Civil War and the Great Depression—and Pattison in turn appointed Cassidy state Attorney General.

Cassidy's wife died in the last year of his term.  At the completion of his term, Cassidy returned to private practice. He died in 1889, and was buried in Laurel Hill Cemetery.

Legacy
The Lewis C. Cassidy School in Philadelphia was named after him. Singer Eva Cassidy is his 2nd great-granddaughter.

Notes

Citations

References
 
 
 
 

1829 births
1889 deaths
19th-century American lawyers
19th-century American politicians
American people of Irish descent
American political bosses from Pennsylvania
Burials at Laurel Hill Cemetery (Philadelphia)
Central High School (Philadelphia) alumni
Lawyers from New York City
Lawyers from Philadelphia
Pennsylvania Attorneys General
Pennsylvania Democrats
Politicians from New York City
Politicians from Philadelphia

External links
Lewis C. Cassidy Academics Plus School Website